Andrei Vikentyevich Zygmantovich or Andrey Zyhmantovich (born 2 December 1962) is a Belarusian football coach and a former player. He is currently the head coach of Belarus U19.

Mainly a defensive midfielder with good positioning and skills, he played for nearly a decade with Dinamo Minsk, also having abroad stints in the Netherlands (only one year) and Spain; in the early 2000s, he embarked on a coaching career.

Zygmantovich represented the Soviet Union at the 1990 World Cup and later played for Belarus.

Club career
Born in Minsk, Soviet Union, Zygmantovich started playing for FC Dinamo Minsk. In his second professional season, he appeared 30 times and netted twice to help his hometown side win the only Soviet League in their history, edging FC Dynamo Kyiv by one point. After a spell with FC Groningen, the 30-year-old returned to the club where he would spend most of his career.

In early 1993, Zygmantovich moved abroad again, now to Spain with Racing de Santander where he would play the next three full campaigns, teaming up with former compatriots (Russian) Ilshat Faizulin, Dmitri Popov and Dmitri Radchenko. In 1993–94, he was an instrumental element as the Cantabrians achieved one of their best ever finishes in La Liga (eighth).

Zygmantovich started coaching in 2001 in his country, including the national team's under-19. In 2007, he moved to Lithuania with FBK Kaunas.

International career
Zygmantovich made his debut for the Soviet Union on 28 March 1984, in an exhibition game with West Germany. He represented the nation at the 1990 FIFA World Cup, scoring a goal against Cameroon (4–0, although in a final group stage exit) which turned out to be his last international game for the country.

Zygmantovich later appeared for Belarus in nine matches, his first being a 1–1 friendly draw with Ukraine in Minsk, on 28 October 1992.

International goals

Honours
Dinamo Minsk
Soviet Top League: 1982
Belarusian Premier League: 1992–93

References

External links
LegionerKulichi profile 
RussiaTeam biography and profile 

1962 births
Living people
Footballers from Minsk
Soviet footballers
Belarusian footballers
Association football defenders
Association football midfielders
Soviet Top League players
Belarusian Premier League players
FC Dinamo Minsk players
Eredivisie players
FC Groningen players
La Liga players
Segunda División players
Racing de Santander players
Soviet Union international footballers
Belarus international footballers
Dual internationalists (football)
1990 FIFA World Cup players
Soviet expatriate footballers
Belarusian expatriate footballers
Expatriate footballers in the Netherlands
Expatriate footballers in Spain
Belarusian expatriate sportspeople in Spain
Belarusian expatriate sportspeople in the Netherlands
Belarusian football managers
FC Partizan Minsk managers
FC Dinamo Minsk managers
FC Naftan Novopolotsk managers
Expatriate football managers in Russia
Belarus national football team managers
FC Rukh Brest managers